Wang Fei (born 25 March 1963 (age:59) in Beijing) is a Chinese former basketball player who competed in the 1988 Summer Olympics.

He was the head coach of the China men's national basketball team between 1997–99 and 2001-02.

References

1963 births
Living people
Basketball players from Beijing
Bayi Rockets players
Chinese men's basketball players
1990 FIBA World Championship players
Olympic basketball players of China
Basketball players at the 1988 Summer Olympics
Asian Games medalists in basketball
Basketball players at the 1986 Asian Games
Basketball players at the 1990 Asian Games
Chinese basketball coaches
Asian Games gold medalists for China
Medalists at the 1986 Asian Games
Medalists at the 1990 Asian Games